Miss World 1965, the 15th edition of the Miss World pageant, was held on 19 November 1965 at the Lyceum Ballroom in London, UK. The winner was Lesley Langley of the United Kingdom. She was crowned by Miss World 1964, Ann Sidney of United Kingdom. The UK became the second country to win the contest two years in succession. The first country to achieve this was Sweden when winning in 1951 and 1952. Former British winner, Rosemarie Frankland (Miss World 1961) performed a dance routine alongside Lionel Blair as part of the show's cabaret.

Results

Contestants

  – Lidia Alcira Díaz
  – Jan Rennison
  – Ingrid Kopetzky 
  – Lucy Emilie Nossent
  – Gabriela Cornel Kempff
  – Berenice Lunardi
  – Carol Ann Tidey 
  – Shirlene Minerva de Silva
  – Nubia Angelina Bustillo Gallo
  – Marta Eugenia Escalante Fernández
  – Krystalia Psara
  – Yvonne Hanne Ekman
  – Corine Mirguett Corral
  – Raija Marja-Liisa Salminen
  – Christiane Sibellin
  – Ndey Jagne
  – Karin Schütze
  – Rosemarie Viňales
 - Maria Geka
  – Janny de Knegt
  – Edda Inés Mungula
  – Sigrún Vignisdóttir
  – Gladys Anne Waller 
  – Shlomit Gat
  – Guya Libraro
  – Carol Joan McFarlane
  – Yuko Oguchi
  – Nyla Munir Haddad
  – Lee Eun-ah
  – Yolla George Harb
  – Melvilla Mardea Harris
  – Marie-Anne Geisen
  – Clara Eunice de Run
  – Wilhelmina Mallia
  – Lucette Garcia
  – Gay Lorraine Phelps
  – Lourdes Cárdenas Gilardi
  – Lesley Bunting 
  – Carrol Adele Davis
  – Anita van Eyck
  – Britt Marie Lindblad
  – Raymonde Doucco
  – Marie Tapare 
  – Zeineb Ben Lamine
  – Lesley Langley 
  – Dianna Lynn Batts 
  – Raquel Luz Delgado
  – Nancy Elizabeth González Aceituno

Judges
Miss World 1965 contestants were evaluated by a panel of judges, among whom included Martine Carol, a French actress.

Notes

Debuts
 Costa Rica, Gambia, Malta, and Syria competed in Miss World for the first time.

Returning countries
 Australia and Tahiti last competed in 1960.
 Rhodesia last competed in 1961.
 Bolivia, Cyprus, Israel, Jordan, Malaysia, and Peru last competed in 1963.

Nations not competing
 
  – Flora Sánchez Argüello
 
 
  – Zerrin Arbaş

References

External links
 Miss World official website

Miss World
1965 in London
1965 beauty pageants
Beauty pageants in the United Kingdom
November 1965 events in the United Kingdom